You can't have your cake and eat it (too) is a popular English idiomatic proverb or figure of speech. The proverb literally means "you cannot simultaneously retain possession of a cake and eat it, too". Once the cake is eaten, it is gone. It can be used to say that one cannot have two incompatible things, or that one should not try to have more than is reasonable. The proverb's meaning is similar to the phrases "you can't have it both ways" and "you can't have the best of both worlds."

For those unfamiliar with it, the proverb may sound confusing due to the ambiguity of the word 'have', which can mean 'keep' or 'to have in one's possession', but which can also be used as a synonym for 'eat' (e.g. 'to have breakfast'). Some find the common form of the proverb to be incorrect or illogical and instead prefer: "You can't eat your cake and [then still] have it (too)". Indeed, this used to be the most common form of the expression until the 1930s–1940s, when it was overtaken by the have-eat variant. Another, less common, version uses 'keep' instead of 'have'.

Choosing between having and eating a cake illustrates the concept of trade-offs or opportunity cost.

History and usage
An early recording of the phrase is in a letter on 14 March 1538 from Thomas, Duke of Norfolk, to Thomas Cromwell, as "a man can not have his cake and eat his cake". The phrase occurs with the clauses reversed in John Heywood's A dialogue Conteinyng the Nomber in Effect of All the Prouerbes in the Englishe Tongue from 1546, as "wolde you bothe eate your cake, and have your cake?". In John Davies's Scourge of Folly of 1611, the same order is used, as "A man cannot eat his cake and haue it stil."

In Jonathan Swift's 1738 farce Polite Conversation, the character Lady Answerall says "she cannot eat her cake and have her cake". The order was reversed in a posthumous adaptation of "Polite Conversation" in 1749 called "Tittle Tattle; or, Taste A-la-Mode", as "And she cannot have her Cake and eat her Cake". A modern-sounding variant from 1812, "We cannot have our cake and eat it too", can be found in R. C. Knopf's Document Transcriptions of the War of 1812 (1959).

According to Google Ngram Viewer, a search engine that charts the frequencies of phrases throughout the decades, the eat-have order used to be the most common variant (at least in written form) before being surpassed by the have-eat version in the 1930s and 40s.

In 1996, the eat-have variant played a role in the apprehension of the Unabomber, whose real name is Ted Kaczynski. In his manifesto, which the terrorist sent to newspapers in the wake of his bombings, Kaczynski advocated the undoing of the industrial revolution, writing: "As for the negative consequences of eliminating industrial society — well, you can’t eat your cake and have it too." James R. Fitzgerald, an FBI forensic linguist, noted this (then) uncommon variant of the proverb and later discovered that Kaczynski had also used it in a letter to his mother. This, among other clues, led to his identification and arrest.

In her 2002 book, classicist Katharina Volk of Columbia University used the phrase to describe the development of poetic imagery in didactic Latin poetry, naming the principle behind the imagery's adoption and application the "have-one's-cake-and-eat-it-too principle".

Logicality
The proverb, while commonly used, is at times questioned by people who feel the expression to be illogical or incorrect. As comedian Billy Connolly once put it: "What good is [having] a cake if you can't eat it?" According to Paul Brians, Professor of English at Washington State University, the confusion about the idiom stems from the verb to have, which can refer to possessing, but also to eating, e.g. "Let's have breakfast" or "I'm having a sandwich". Brians argues that "You can't eat your cake and have it too" is a more logical variant than "You can't have your cake and eat it too", because the verb-order of "eat-have" makes more sense: once you've eaten your cake, you don't have it anymore.

Ben Zimmer, writing for the Language Log of the University of Pennsylvania, states that the interpretation of the two variants relies on the assumption of either sequentiality or simultaneity. If one believes the phrase to imply sequentiality, then the "eat-have" variant could be seen as a more logical form: you cannot eat your cake and then (still) have it, but you actually can have your cake and then eat it. The former phrase would demonstrate an impossibility better, while the latter phrase is more of a statement of fact, arguably making it less suitable as an idiomatic proverb. However, if one believes the "and" conjoining the verbs to imply simultaneity of action rather than sequentiality of action, then both versions are usable as an idiom, because "cake-eating and cake-having are mutually exclusive activities, regardless of the syntactic ordering", Zimmer writes.

In response, Richard Mason disagreed with Zimmer's assertion on the mutually exclusiveness of the two actions: "simultaneous cake-having and cake-eating are NOT mutually exclusive. On the contrary, generally I cannot eat something at any time when I do not have it. But I eat things when I have them all the time. Only when the object is entirely consumed do I no longer have it (and at that time the eating is also terminated)." Therefore, Mason considers the "have-eat" variant to be "logically indefensible". Zimmer reacted to Mason by stating: "the 'having' part of the idiom seems to me to imply possession over a long period of time, rather than the transient cake-having that occurs during cake-eating". He concludes that it is ultimately not relevant to ponder over the logicality of crystallized, commonly used phrases. "Few people protest the expression head over heels to mean 'topsy-turvy,' despite the fact that its "literal" reading describes a normal, non-topsy-turvy bodily alignment".

Stan Carey, writing for the Macmillan Dictionary Blog, likens the "have-eat" vs. "eat-have" question with the discussion over "I could care less" and "I couldn't care less", two phrases that are used to refer to the same thing yet are construed differently, the former sounding illogical because saying "I could care less" would mean that you actually do care to some degree. Carey writes that even though the "eat-have" form of the cake-proverb might make more sense, "idioms do not hinge on logic, and expecting them to make literal sense is futile. But it can be hard to ward off the instinctive wish that language align better with common sense." Carey jokingly states that the cake-idiom actually does have its cake and eats it.

In other languages

Various expressions are used to convey similar idioms in other languages:

 – To take a swim and not get wet.
 – Have the wolf full and the sheep in place. Երկու երնեկ մի տեղ չի լինում - Two good things do not happen together. Մի տոմսով երկու թատրոն - One ticket for two theatrical performances (This idiom is also used for a situation of an undesired scandalous consequence of an action).  Գետը մտնես՝ չոր էլնես - Get into a river and stay dry. And a vulgar version: Համ բանը տեղը լինի, համ չբեր լինի: - Her to be sexually active but sterile. 
 – One who neither agrees, nor disagrees. (literal translation: Neither loves their lover enough, nor lets them go.)
 – You can't have both the wolf fed, and the lamb intact. A more vulgar version is: Не може хем душата в рая, хем кура в гъза. – You can't have both the dick in the ass and the soul in heaven. This phrase is similar to the Romanian expression below.
 – You can't have both the fish and the bear's paw. (Bear's paw is considered a delicacy in ancient China.)
 – You can't sit on two chairs at the same time. Also, Vlk se nažral a koza zůstala celá. – The wolf ate and the goat remained whole.
 – You cannot both blow and have flour in your mouth. Also, Man kan ikke få både i pose og (i) sæk - You can't get both in bag and (in) sack.
: There is no exact equivalent of this proverb in the Dutch language, but a similar phrase is Kiezen of delen – Choose or divide. Another similar proverb is Van twee walletjes eten – "Eating from two banks [of the ditch]", a pejorative saying which means that someone joins two opposing parties and tries to benefit from the situation in a manipulative or opportunistic fashion. A less derogatory expression is De kool en de geit sparen – To save both the cabbage and the goat: attempting to satisfy conflicting demands of two parties, while not trying to offend either. Another one is: Je kunt je geld maar één keer uitgeven – "You can spend your money only one time".
 – Cakes can not be both eaten and stored (at the same time).
French: Vouloir le beurre et l'argent du beurre – To want the butter and the money used to buy the butter. This proverb can be emphasized by adding et le sourire de la crémière ("and a smile from the [female] milkmaid") or, in a more familiar version, et le cul de la crémière ("and the [female] milkmaid's butt"). Similar to the Dutch, Hungarian and Romanian expressions: Ménager la chèvre et le chou – To spare the goat and the cabbage: attempting to satisfy conflicting demands of two parties, while not trying to offend either.
 – Wash my fur but don't get me wet. Also, Man kann nicht auf zwei Hochzeiten tanzen – One cannot dance at two weddings (at the same time).
Swiss German: Du chasch nit dr Füfer und s Weggli ha – You can't have the five cent coin and a bread roll. Or "Du chasch nöd de Foifer, Weggli und Bäckerstochter ha" - You can't have the 5 cent coin, a bread roll and the baker's daughter.
 – You want the entire pie and the dog full.
 – To have a laddu (a sweet candy) in both of your hands.
 – You can't eat the cake and keep it whole. Also, אי אפשר להחזיק את המקל משני הקצוות – It is impossible to hold the stick from both ends.
 – To have a laddu (a sweet candy) in both of your hands. Also, चित भी मेरी पट भी मेरी. – Heads are mine and tails are mine too.
 – It is impossible to feed the goat but keep the cabbage. Also, Egy fenékkel nem lehet két lovat megülni – You can't ride two horses with one backside. Also, Nem lehet egyszerre házaséletet is élni és szűznek is maradni. – You can't consummate the marriage yet still remain a virgin.
 – You can't have and have not at the same time. Also, Bágt er að blása og hafa mjöl í munni. – You cannot both blow and have flour in your mouth.
 – To want the barrel full (of wine) and the wife drunk.
 – If you chase two rabbits at the same time, you will not catch either.
 – Desire over rice, love over relatives.
 – If you try to catch two rabbits, you will end up getting none. 
 – Don't want to lose what's in the armpit but also want what's on the beam (or roof).
 – To have a laddu (a sweet candy) in both of your hands.
 – You can't get both in bag and sack.
: There is no equivalent of this proverb in Papiamento, but a similar phrase is: Skohe of lag'i skohe – Choose or let choose.
 – You can not be on both sides.
 – Wanting both God and the dates.
 – To eat the cookie and have the cookie.
 – Wanting the sun to shine on the threshing floor, while it rains on the turnip field.
Brazil:  Assobiar e chupar cana - Wanting to whistle and suck on sugar cane (at the same time).
 – You can't reconcile the goat and the cabbage. Also, Și cu tigaia unsă și cu slănina în pod – To have the pan greased and the lard in the attic. A more vulgar version is: Şi cu dânsa-intr-însa, şi cu sufletu-n rai – To have 'it' in 'it' and the soul in heaven.
 – Wanting to eat a fish without first catching it from the waters. This is a euphemism for a common vulgar expression и рыбку съесть, и на хуй сесть – Wanting to both eat a fish and to sit on a dick. This phrase was first used by Alexander Pushkin in a private letter.
 – To have both lamb and money. Also,  - Both the sheep and the money. Also,  – The wolf is full, and the sheep are all accounted for.  
 – Wishing to be both at mass and in the procession. Also, Estar en misa y repicando (or Estar en misa y tocar la campana) – To be both at mass and in the bell tower, ringing the bells.
An alternative idiom in Spanish would be No se puede estar al plato y a las tajadas - You can't pay attention to the plate and to the slices.
Another alternative idiom in Spanish would be No se puede hacer tortilla sin romper los huevos - You can't make an omelette without breaking the eggs.
Argentina: La chancha y los veinte. – The pig and the twenties. This comes from the old piggy banks for children that used to contain coins of 20 cents. The only way to get the coins was to break the piggy bank open – hence the phrase. This can be emphasized by adding y la máquina de hacer chorizos – and the machine to make sausage.
 – To eat the cake and still have it.
 – Desire to have both the moustache and to drink the porridge.
 – You cannot have both mother and food. (Traditionally, the mother prepares the food in the household.)
 – You (a lady) wanted a man, but you hate the beard.
 – Neither giving up one's lover nor one's self.
 – Extract double privilege from a single ticket. Also, دو کشتی کا سوار کہیں نہیں جاتا - The rider of two ships doesn't get anywhere. 
 – You can't sit on two chairs.
 – You gain one thing but lose the other.
 – You can't have it all ways. Also, Allwch chi ddim cadw torth a’i bwyta hi – You can't keep a loaf and eat it.
 – You can't eat twice at the same time. Also, Óó pé láyé, ojú re ò nìí ribi, òkan lóó fowó mú – You can't live long, and don't want to witness bad occurrence. You've got to choose one.

Cakeism

The expression “cakeism” and the associated noun and adjective “cakeist” have come into general use in British English, especially in political journalism, and have been accepted into English dictionaries.

The expressions, which reverse the traditional proverb, refer to a wish to enjoy two desirable but incompatible alternatives, especially regarding the UK’s approach to Brexit negotiations and subsequent deliberations. It developed after comments made by the then UK foreign secretary Boris Johnson in 2016, that “I’ve never been an Outer.” “My policy on cake is pro having it and pro eating it.” Subsequently, as prime minister, he described the UK’s post-Brexit trade deal  as a “cakeist treaty”.

The neologisms have since become objects of derision and have led to sarcastic re-reversals.

References

External links

Post at "The Phrase Finder", quoting Wise Words and Wives' Tales: The Origins, Meanings and Time-Honored Wisdom of Proverbs and Folk Sayings Olde and New and The Random House Dictionary of Popular Proverbs and Sayings.

English phrases
English-language idioms
Quotations from literature
British political phrases
16th-century neologisms
Metaphors referring to food and drink
Proverbs